"Working for Vacation" is the first single from Cibo Matto's second album, Stereo Type A, released in 1999. B-side "Vamos a la Playa" was later included on the 2007 compilation Pom Pom: The Essential Cibo Matto.

Track listing
Japanese pressing
"Working for Vacation"
"Everybody Loves the Sunshine"
"Vamos a la Playa"

1999 singles
Shibuya-kei songs
1999 songs
Warner Records singles
Cibo Matto songs